{{DISPLAYTITLE:Omega1 Cancri}}

Omega1 Cancri, which is Latinized from ω1 Cancri, is a yellow-hued star in the zodiac constellation of Cancer. It is a faint star near the lower limit of visibility to the naked eye, having an apparent visual magnitude of 5.85. At that distance, the visual magnitude of the star is diminished by an extinction factor of 0.10 due to interstellar dust. It is receding from the Sun with a radial velocity of +2 km/s.

At an estimated age of 270 million years, this is an evolved G-type giant with a stellar classification of G8 III. With the supply of hydrogen at its core exhausted, the star has cooled and expanded to 18 times the girth of the Sun. It has 3.4 times the mass of the Sun and is radiating 224 times the solar luminosity from its photosphere at an effective temperature of 5,070. The surface metallicity of this star – what astronomers term the abundance of elements other than hydrogen and helium – is 41% higher than in the Sun.

References

G-type giants
Cancer (constellation)
Cancri, Omega1
BD+25 1812
Cancri, 02
065714
039191
3124